Ultadanga is one of the most crowded junctions in Kolkata. The place is located at the north-eastern fringe of the city and marks the limit of Kolkata district. Prominent places in Ultadanga are Telenga Bagan and Muchi Bazar.

Etymology
Ultadanga lay outside the Maratha Ditch, beyond Halsibagan, where the Sikh billionaire Umichand had a garden. It was the land on the opposite bank (ulta in Bengali).

History
The East India Company obtained from the Mughal emperor Farrukhsiyar, in 1717, the right to rent from 38 villages surrounding their settlement. Of these 5 lay across the Hooghly in what is now Howrah district. The remaining 33 villages were on the Calcutta side. After the fall of Siraj-ud-daulah, the last independent Nawab of Bengal, it purchased these villages in 1758 from Mir Jafar and reorganised them. These villages were known en-bloc as Dihi Panchannagram and Ultadanga was one of them. It was considered to be a suburb beyond the limits of the Maratha Ditch.

The name, Ulta Danga, comes from the original name of the place, Ulta Dingi, or a place where small boats which were colloquially called Dingis were made or repaired. It was a ghat area and chances are that this too would be on the banks of the Ganges at some point of time in history, before the river changed its course.

In 1889, Maniktala, Ultadanga and Beliaghata became 'fringe area wards' of Kolkata Municipal Corporation.

Geography

Police district 
Ultadanga police station is part of the Eastern Suburban division of Kolkata Police. It is located at Block 13, CIT Scheme No. VIII M, Kolkata-700067.

Ultadanga Women police station, located at the same address as above, covers all police districts under the jurisdiction of the Eastern Suburban division i.e. Beliaghata, Entally, Manicktolla, Narkeldanga, Ultadanga, Tangra and Phoolbagan.

Economy

Ultadanga is densely populated with not only people but also with shops, restaurants, shopping malls, banks, Government housings, Government and private offices, educational and training institutes etc. HSBC, AXIS Bank, Bank of Baroda, United Bank of India, Federal Bank and State Bank of India are some of the bank branches located in this area. Ultadanga is near to some of the most happening shopping malls in the city like Mani Square, City Center, Charnok City and Pantaloon in Kankurgachi etc. Sony World, one of Kolkata’s biggest Sony showrooms is located at Ultadanga crossing near the station. Honey da Dhaba, Bika, Delhi Darbar and Rose are few of the many restaurants located in and close to the Ultadanga area. Arena Animation Kankurgachi, Jetking Institute, FIIT JEE, Credence Academy, Kolkata Cables, BSNL and BrandMantra Solutions Pvt. Ltd. are some of the prominent institutes and offices in Ultadanga and its surrounding areas. There is also a TITAN Showroom in Ultadanga.

Transport

Hudco More in Ultadanga is one of the busiest crossings in Kolkata. It is the junction of four roads:- Ultadanga Main Road/ Bidhannagar Road (towards Maniktala), VIP Road (towards Lake Town), CIT Road (towards Kankurgachi) and Bagmari Road/ 1st Avenue (towards Salt Lake). EM Bypass also runs parallel to CIT Road on the eastern boundary of Ultadanga. Many buses along with taxis and auto-rickshaws are available on these roads. Kolkata tram route no. 18 serves Ultadanga (via CIT Road). Ultadanga and Gouribari (Maniktala) are connected with Arobindo Setu (Gouribari Bridge), which was constructed in 1974. In 2011, Ultadanga Flyover was opened in Ultadanga to connect EM Bypass with VIP Road easily.

One of Kolkata’s busiest railway stations, Bidhannagar Road railway station, is located in Ultadanga. It remains packed with passengers throughout the day especially on weekdays.

Education
The Sir Gurudas Mahavidyalaya, a college previously known as Gurudas College of Commerce, affiliated to University of Calcutta is located in Ultadanga.

Fire

On 12 January 2010, a fire broke out at a slum in Ultadanga, popularly known as 'Basanti Colony', leaving 1 man dead and 450 homeless. The homes were rebuilt by the Government and were redistributed among the residents free of cost within 6 months.

References

External links

Road junctions in India
Neighbourhoods in Kolkata